Deidre Carter is a South African politician who has served as a Member of the National Assembly of South Africa since May 2009 representing the Congress of the People. Carter also serves as Deputy Secretary-General of the Congress of the People.

Early life and career
Carter was born in the Free State but moved to KwaZulu-Natal in 1990. She owned several businesses including restaurants and hotels.

Political career
Carter was a founding member of the Congress of the People and attended the first National Convention. After the conference, she was elected Deputy Secretary-General of the party. She was selected as a candidate for the party and elected at the 2009 election. Carter entered politics due to her concern about crime and corruption, deterioration in the rule of law and problems in the public healthcare and education systems.

References

Year of birth missing (living people)
Living people
Congress of the People (South African political party) politicians
Members of the National Assembly of South Africa
People from Pietermaritzburg
South African businesspeople
White South African people
Women members of the National Assembly of South Africa